Emamzadeh Davud may refer to:
 Emamzadeh Davud, Kermanshah
 Emamzadeh Davud, Tehran